Paitou Township is a rural township in Xiangtan County, Hunan Province, People's Republic of China.

Administrative division
The township is divided into 42 villages, the following areas: Dafuchong Village, Chenshan Village, Zishan Village, Huangjingping Village, Xiashan Village, Anquan Village, Zhinan Village, Shuangquan Village, Dongshan Village, Changshan Village, Xingxing Village, Renbei Village, Chuanxingshan Village, Yantang Village, Aozhou Village, Songzi Village, Yanchong Village, Longtan Village, Xuejia Village, Cangchong Village, Yuetang Village, Huilongqiao Village, Tongxin Village, Paitou Village, Outang Village, Gaobeitang Village, Siyin Village, Yangjialing Village, Hongwei Village, Zhongjia Village, Haoguang Village, Hexing Village, Nanqiao Village, Xiangnan Village, Shangnan Village, Liutian Village, Xingyang Village, Louchong Village, Heyun Village, Tongzi Village, Yanhua Village, and Shigang Village.

History
In 1995, Paitou Township was built.

Geography
Yin Mountain is the scenic spot in the town.

Liutian Reservoir and Yanchong Reservoir are located in the township

Economy
Pig and rice are important to the economy.

Attractions
Zuo Zongtang's Former Residence, was built in Qing Dynasty.
Zhou Xiaozhou's Former Residence, was built in Qing Dynasty.

Culture
Huaguxi is the most influence local theater.

Celebrity
Zuo Zongtang, politician.
, musician.
Zhou Xiaozhou, politician.

References

External links

Divisions of Xiangtan County